Ariston of Pharsalus was a Thessalian hetairos of Alexander the Great and a friend of Medius of Larissa, whose dinner party he attended on 16 Daisios May 323.

References
Who's who in the age of Alexander the Great: prosopography of Alexander's empire  

Hetairoi
Ancient Thessalian generals
4th-century BC Greek people
People from Farsala